Dawn Black (born April 1, 1943) is a politician in British Columbia, Canada.

Born Dawn Whitty, Black became involved in politics from a young age, she became an assistant to New Democratic Party Member of Parliament Pauline Jewett.

Member of Parliament
She was elected as the MP for New Westminster—Burnaby in the 1988 federal election, succeeding the retiring Jewett. As an MP, one of her most notable achievements was proposing a private members bill that made December 6, the anniversary of the Montreal Massacre, a permanent day of remembrance and action against violence against women. She also led the opposition to the Tories' anti-abortion measure and proposed an anti-stalking measure, which was later adopted by Parliament.

Elections
In the 1993 election, she lost her seat to Reform Party candidate Paul Forseth. She lost to him again in the 1997 election, but defeated Forseth in the 2006 election. Black was the NDP's defence critic.

Afghan issues
On April 5, 2006, during the first question period of the 39th Parliament Black asked Gordon O'Connor, then Minister of National Defence, to renegotiate the prisoner transfer agreement with the Afghan government. O'Connor refused saying "Mr. Speaker, we have no intention of redrafting the agreement. The Red Cross and the Red Crescent are charged with ensuring that prisoners are not abused. There is nothing in the agreement that prevents Canada from determining the fate of prisoners so there is no need to make any change in the agreement."

Black was prominent on the issue, which eventually saw the resignation of Gordon O'Connor and the negotiation of a new transfer agreement.

Move to provincial politics
In March 2009 she announced she would step down as MP in order to run for the BC NDP in the upcoming BC provincial election, aiming to succeed ailing NDP MLA Chuck Puchmayr in New Westminster. She stated she would remain in federal office long enough to draft a private member's bill restricting the use of civilian armoured vehicles, a significant issue in a city dealing with gang violence. Following her departure from federal politics, she was handily elected to the BC Legislature.

Black is currently a board member at the Broadbent Institute, a social democratic think tank.

Interim Leader of the BC NDP
Black was unanimously nominated by the provincial caucus to be the interim leader of the BC NDP on January 19, 2011. The Provincial Council ratified the decision one day later. NDP President Moe Sihota said "With Dawn’s record of service as an elected official and her deep roots within the party, she’s the right choice to lead the party and the caucus before the new leader takes on".

Black said after the nomination: "I've done a lot of tough things in my life - I've travelled to Afghanistan...The challenge is to prove to British Columbians that we're working together. Everybody made a commitment today to expose the broken promises of the Liberal government."

Archives 
There is a Dawn Black fonds at Library and Archives Canada. Archival reference number is R11547.

References

External links
 
 Dawn Black

1943 births
Living people
British Columbia New Democratic Party MLAs
Canadian Anglicans
Women members of the House of Commons of Canada
Female Canadian political party leaders
Members of the House of Commons of Canada from British Columbia
New Democratic Party MPs
People from New Westminster
Politicians from Vancouver
Women MLAs in British Columbia
21st-century Canadian politicians
21st-century Canadian women politicians